France competed at the 1932 Winter Olympics in Lake Placid, United States.

Medalists

Bobsleigh

Cross-country skiing

Men

Figure skating

Pairs

References

 Olympic Winter Games 1932, full results by sports-reference.com

Nations at the 1932 Winter Olympics
1932
Olympics, Winter